Place of Weeping (theatrically as Afrika - Land der Hoffnung), is a 1986 South African drama film directed by Darrell Roodt and produced by Anant Singh for Place of Weeping Productions. The film stars James Whyle, Gcina Mhlophe and Charles Comyn in the lead roles whereas Norman Coombes, Michelle du Toit, Kerneels Coertzen and Patrick Shai made supportive roles. The film describes in detail about the multicultural groups in South Africa and how South Africa collapsed by the works of South Africans and the strife in South Africa's oppressive regime.

This is the first anti-apartheid motion picture made entirely in South Africa. The film made its premier on 5 December 1986. The film received positive reviews from critics.

Cast
 James Whyle as Philip Seago 
 Gcina Mhlophe as Gracie 
 Charles Comyn as Tokkie van Rensburg
 Norman Coombes as Father Eagen
 Michelle du Toit as Maria van Rensburg
 Kerneels Coertzen as Public Prosecutor
 Patrick Shai as Lucky
 Ramolao Makhene as Themba
 Siphiwe Khumalo as Joseph
 Doreen Mazibuko as Young Girl
 Thoko Ntshinga as Joseph's Widow
 Elaine Proctor as Journalist
 Ian Steadman as Dave, Editor
 Marcel van Heerden as Cafe Owner
 Arms Seutcoau as Faction Fighter
 Nandi Nyembe as Young Girl's Mother
 Ernest Ndlovu as Man with Gun
 Nicky Rebelo as Farmer 1 
 Sean Taylor as Farmer 2

References

External links 
 

1986 films
1986 drama films
South African drama films
Afrikaans-language films
English-language South African films
Zulu-language films